William Craig Berkson (August 30, 1939 – June 16, 2016) was an American poet, critic, and teacher who was active in the art and literary worlds from his early twenties on.

Early life and education
Born in New York City on August 30, 1939, Bill Berkson grew up on Manhattan's Upper East Side, the only child of Seymour Berkson, general manager of International News Service and later publisher of the New York Journal American, and the fashion publicist Eleanor Lambert. Although his father was of Jewish descent, the son did not find out until he was a teenager. His mother was Presbyterian. He attended The Day School of the Church of the Heavenly Rest and transferred to Trinity School in 1945. He graduated from Lawrenceville School in 1957. He dropped out of Brown University to return to New York after his father died. He studied poetry at The New School for Social Research with Kenneth Koch. He attended Columbia University and New York University's Institute of Fine Arts.

Having begun writing poetry at Lawrenceville, encouraged there by such teachers as John Silver and the eminent Emily Dickinson scholar, Thomas H. Johnson, he went on to study short story writing with John Hawkes and prosody with S. Foster Damon at Brown. But his full commitment to poetry was prompted under the tutelage of Kenneth Koch in spring, 1959 at the New School for Social Research. It was also through Koch that he was introduced to the poetry and arts community loosely termed the New York School, which in turn led to close friendships with Frank O'Hara and such senior artists as Philip Guston and Alex Katz, as well as with poets and artists of his own generation such as Ron Padgett, Joe Brainard, George Schneeman, Ted Berrigan, Anne Waldman, Jim Carroll and others.

Career
After leaving Columbia in 1960, Berkson started work as an editorial associate at ARTnews, where he continued for the next three years. During the remainder of the 1960s, he was a regular contributor to both ARTnews and Arts, guest editor at the Museum of Modern Art, an associate producer of a program on art for public television, and taught literature and writing workshops at the New School for Social Research and Yale University.

After moving to Northern California in 1970, Berkson began editing and publishing a series of poetry books and magazines under the Big Sky imprint and taught regularly in the California Poets in the Schools program.

In 1975, he married the artist Lynn O'Hare; their son Moses Edwin Clay Berkson was born in Bolinas, California, on January 23, 1976. He also has a daughter, Siobhan O'Hare Mora Lopez (b. 1969), and three grandchildren, Henry Berkson and Estella and Lourdes Mora Lopez.  His friendships during his California years included those with; Joanne Kyger, Duncan McNaughton and Philip Whalen.

Berkson is the author of some twenty collections and pamphlets of poetry—including most recently Portrait and Dream: New & Selected Poems and Expect Delays, both from Coffee House Press.  His poems have also appeared in many magazines and anthologies and have been translated into French, Russian, Hungarian, Dutch, Czechoslovakian, Romanian, Italian, German and Spanish. Les Parties du Corps, a selection of his poetry translated into French, appeared from Joca Seria, Nantes, in 2011. Other recent books are What's Your Idea of a Good Time?: Letters & Interviews 1977–1985 with Bernadette Mayer; BILL with drawings by Colter Jacobsen; Ted Berrigan with George Schneeman; Not an Exit with Léonie Guyer and Repeat After Me with John Zurier.

Beside the aforementioned collaborations, he executed extensive projects with visual artists Philip Guston, Alex Katz, Joe Brainard, Lynn O'Hare and Greg Irons, as well as with the poets Frank O'Hara, Larry Fagin, Ron Padgett, Anne Waldman and Bernadette Mayer.

In the mid-1980s, Berkson resumed writing art criticism on a regular basis, contributing monthly reviews and articles to Artforum from 1985 to 1991; he became a corresponding editor for Art in America in 1988 and contributing editor for artcritical.com and has also written frequently for such magazines as Aperture, Modern Painters, Art on Paper and others. In 1984, he began teaching art history and literature and organizing the public lectures program at the San Francisco Art Institute, where he also served as interim dean in 1990 and Director of Letters and Science from 1993 to 1998. He retired from SFAI in 2008 and later held the position of Professor Emeritus. During the same period, he was also on the visiting faculty of Naropa Institute, California College of Arts and Crafts and Mills College.  Berkson continued until the end of his life to lecture widely in colleges and universities. He published three collections of art criticism, to date, the last being For the Ordinary Artist: Short Reviews, Occasional Pieces & More.

As a sometime curator, he organized or co-curated such exhibitions as Ronald Bladen: Early and Late (SFMoMA), Albert York (Mills College), Why Painting I & II (Susan Cummins Gallery), Homage to George Herriman (Campbell-Thiebaud Gallery), Facing Eden: 100 years of Northern California Landscape Art (M.H. de Young Museum), George Schneeman (CUE Foundation), Gordon Cook: Out There (Nelson Gallery, University of California, Davis), George Schneeman in Italy (Instituto di Cultura Italiano, San Francisco), and, with Ron Padgett, A Painter and His Poets: The Art of George Schneeman (Poets House, New York).

In 1998, he married the curator Constance Lewallen, with whom he lived in the Eureka Valley section of San Francisco. Berkson died of a heart attack in San Francisco on June 16, 2016, at the age of 76.

Berkson's archive of literary, artistic and other materials, including extensive correspondence and collaborations with O'Hara, Guston, Brainard, Mayer and others through the years is maintained in the Special Collections at the Thomas J. Dodd Research Center, University of Connecticut, Storrs.

Bibliography

Poetry

Collaborations

Memoirs
Young Manhattan (w/ Anne Waldman) (Erudite Fangs, 1999)The Far Flowered Shore: Japan 2006/2010'' (Cuneiform Press, 2013)
Since When: A Memoir in Pieces (Coffee House Press, 2018)

Prose
What's Your Idea of a Good Time?: Letters & Interviews (w/ Bernadette Mayer) (Tuumba Press, 2006)

Criticism

Editor

Anthologies
The Young American Poets,10 American Poets, The Young American Writers, The World Anthology, An Anthology of New York Poets,Best & Company,On the Mesa, Calafia, One World Poetry, Another World, Poets & Painters, The Ear, Aerial, Broadway, Broadway 2, Hills/Talks, Wonders, Up Late: American Poetry Since 1970, Best Minds, Out of This World, Reading Jazz, A Norton Anthology of Postmodern American Poetry, American Poets Say Goodbye to the 20th Century, Euro-San Francisco Poetry Festival, The Blind See Only this World, The Angel Hair Anthology, Evidence of the Paranormal, Enough, The New York Poets II, Bay Area Poetics,Hom(m)age to Whitman, POEM, The i.e. Reader, Nuova Poesia Americana: New York, A Norton Anthology of Postmodern American Poetry, Second Edition.

Other
Recordings of poetry on Disconnected (Giorno Poetry Systems) and The World Record (St Marks Poetry Project); Daniel Kane, All Poets Welcome; and in the American Poetry Archive (San Francisco State University), PennSound (University of Pennsylvania) & elsewhere.
Poetry translated into French, Italian, Turkish, Spanish, German, Dutch, Romanian, Arabic, Czechoslovakian and Hungarian.
Art reviews & essays regularly contributed to ARTnews 1961–64; Arts 1964–66; Art in America 1980– ; Artforum 1985–1990; Modern Painters, 1998–2003; artcritical.com 2009.

Awards

References

Sources
Contemporary Authors, Volume 180, Gale Research
Ron Padgett, ed., World Poets, Volume 1, Scribners, 2002
Terence Diggory, Encyclopedia of the New York School Poets, Facts on File, 2009
Daniel Kane, All Poets Welcome, University of California Press, 2003
Steven Clay and Rodney Philips, A Secret Location On The Lower East Side,
Granary/NY Public Library, 1998
Who' s Who in American Art, 2009
Constance Lewallen, Joe Brainard: A Retrospective, Granary Books, 2001
Ron Padgett, ed., Painter Among Poets: The Collaborative Art of George Schneeman, Granary Books, 2004

External links
Recordings
PennSound

Blog Posts

Interviews & Reviews
 In conversation with Robert Glück
 In conversation with David Levi-Strauss
 20 Questions with Bill Berkson
 Bill Berkson on Morton Feldman
 In conversation with Jarett Earnest
 Schwabsky on For the Ordinary Artist
 Interview on Art Practical
Close Listening with Charles Bernstein"

Poetry
  Same Here
 From Dante

1939 births
2016 deaths
Poets from New York (state)
People from the Upper East Side
20th-century American poets
American memoirists
21st-century American poets
Lawrenceville School alumni
Trinity School (New York City) alumni
Brown University people
Columbia University alumni
People from Bolinas, California
San Francisco Art Institute faculty
The New School alumni
American art curators
American literary critics
Jewish American poets
Writers from Manhattan
New York University Institute of Fine Arts alumni
20th-century American non-fiction writers
21st-century American non-fiction writers
21st-century American Jews